Gordon Payzant Barss (1885–1969) was a Canadian Baptist missionary who served in India from 1910 to 1945 through the Canadian Baptist Ministries.

Early life and studies
Payzant Barss was born in Dartmouth, Nova Scotia, and pursued a postgraduate course at the Acadia University during 1903–1904.  Barss later pursued theological studies leading to Bachelor of Divinity at the Colgate Rochester Crozer Divinity School, Rochester (United States of America) in 1910, the same year he married Lena Helene Feistel (1883–1973).

Ecclesiastical career
Barss came to India in 1910 as a missionary of the Canadian Baptist Ministries and served in Tekkali and other northern coastal regions along the Bay of Bengal in Andhra Pradesh till 1945.  Barss became Principal of the Baptist Theological Seminary, Kakinada in 1939 taking over from J. B. McLaurin and led the Seminary for six consecutive academic years until 1945 following which the Seminary Council of the Baptist Theological Seminary appointed Archibald Gordon to succeed him. Barss died in 1969 and is interred in Wolfville, Nova Scotia.

Honours
In 1935, the Acadia University, conferred a Doctor of Divinity by Honoris Causa upon Gordon P. Barss.

References

1885 births
1969 deaths
20th-century Canadian Baptist ministers
Canadian expatriates in India
Baptist writers
Acadia University alumni
Colgate Rochester Crozer Divinity School alumni
People from Dartmouth, Nova Scotia
Writers from Halifax, Nova Scotia
Telugu people
Christian clergy from Andhra Pradesh
Indian Christian theologians
Indian Baptists
Canadian Baptist Ministries missionaries in India
Academic staff of the Senate of Serampore College (University)
Convention of Baptist Churches of Northern Circars pastors